Paolino may refer to:

People with the given name
Paolino Veneto (died 1344), Franciscan historian
Paolino Bertaccini (born 1997), Belgian football player
Paolino Taddei (1860-1925), Italian politician

People with the surname
Joseph R. Paolino Jr. (born 1955), American politician and diplomat

Locations
San Paolino (disambiguation)